Chartershaugh Bridge is a road traffic bridge spanning the River Wear in North East England, linking Penshaw with Fatfield as part of the A182 road. The bridge was opened in 1975 and is named after the former settlement of Chartershaugh, which once stood on a site near the bridge.

Bridges across the River Wear
Bridges completed in 1974
Bridges in Tyne and Wear
Transport in the City of Sunderland